Stephen K. Sanderson (born November 15, 1945) is an American sociologist. His area of focus includes comparative sociology, historical sociology, sociological theory and sociocultural evolution. He is a specialist in sociological theory and comparative and historical sociology and is one of the leading sociologists to develop an evolutionist, yet non-Darwinist, understanding of human society. He has written or edited ten books and about sixty peer-reviewed articles, and is the author of numerous articles and many books, including Evolutionism and Its Critics.

He was a professor of sociology at Indiana University of Pennsylvania. Since 2007 he has been a visiting scholar at the Institute for Research on World-Systems at the University of California, Riverside.

Sanderson received a PhD from the University of Nebraska in 1973.

See also 
Robert L. Carneiro

References

External links
Homepage

1945 births
American sociologists
Living people
Indiana University of Pennsylvania faculty
University of California, Riverside faculty
University of Nebraska alumni